David Levine (born 1960) is a British music, portrait and fashion photographer. He is best known for his work with Culture Club, ABC, Kylie Minogue and The Cure.

David Levine started his career in 1977 while working as a photographer's assistant. He went on to photograph artists live in concert including Iggy Pop live at the Music Machine London and worked as a stills photographer on music videos with the director Tim Pope. As well as working with Culture Club, Levine also worked with a number of other 1980s acts including ABC, The Cure, Kylie Minogue, Jermaine Jackson, 5 Star, and Siouxsie Sioux. Levine quickly established a style of work in the studio, much copied by other music and fashion photographers in the '80s and indeed today his influence can still be seen. That style earned him the nickname 'The man who shot the 80's'. Always filming throughout his stills career, his music videos are as typically stylish and gritty as his stills. Levine's work in both stills and film achieves a style unique to him.

Levine was invited to lecture at the University of Arts London, London College of Fashion in 2014. He lectured in Fashion Photography while continuing with his busy photography and film career.

Levine's 2009 portrait of Paul Nicholls is held in the National Portrait Gallery. Levine is currently lecturing on The Art of Fashion Photography and Film at the University of Arts London, London College of Fashion.

Levine has never won any awards for his work, and is on the record as saying “I don’t do this to get awards, I do it so I know I’m ok at what I do.” Not ever one to compromise, Levine puts friendship ahead of literally anything.

He is the younger brother of record producer Steve Levine.

References

External links

Living people
English photographers
1960 births